Telus World of Science Edmonton (TWOSE) is a broad-based science centre in Edmonton, Alberta, Canada, operated by the (non-profit) Edmonton Space & Science Foundation. The centre is located on the southwest corner of Coronation Park in the neighborhood of Woodcroft. The science centre houses 144,430 sq. ft. of public space and is the largest science centre in Western Canada (by largest total public space). It is currently a member of both the Association of Science-Technology Centers (ASTC) and the Canadian Association of Science Centres (CASC).

History 
1960- The Queen Elizabeth Planetarium, located to the east, operated as the Edmonton's Planetarium, the predecessors to the Edmonton Space Sciences Centre, since 1960 but had become limited by its seating capacity of 65.

1980-  The City of Edmonton selected the Edmonton Space Sciences Centre as the City's flagship project commemorating the Province of Alberta's 75th Anniversary. The original building was designed by architect Douglas Cardinal.

1984- The Edmonton Space Sciences Centre opens to the general public

1990- The Edmonton Space Sciences Centre officially changes its name to Edmonton Space and Science Centre

1993- A new expansion adds 15'000 square feet of space split over two floors. Accompanying this expansion, new facilities lobby, Gift Shop, IMAX Theatre entry, Cafe, large gallery for travelling exhibits, and Visitor Services facilities are all added, as well as a refit of old space.

2001- A $14-million expansion was announced with the addition of a new name, the Odyssium.

2005- The Odyssium has been renamed the Telus World of Science Edmonton with an 8.2 million dollar 20-year partnership established with Telus Communications. The centre attracts over half a million visitors annually and has Canada's largest planetarium dome theatre (the Zeidler Dome).

2016- An ambitious plan is announced to revamp the science centre named the Aurora Project. Budgeted at $41.5 million, the centre would triple in size. The expansion includes:

 A new DVT (Digital Visualization Theatre).
 New galleries.
 An upgraded restaurant.
 A new front entrance.
 A new gift shop.

2016-2018- Phases 1 and 2 are complete with a newly refurbished Purple Pear Restaurant, a complete overhaul of the Zeidler Dome and the reimagined S.P.A.C.E. (Stars, Planets, Astronauts, Comets, etc.) Gallery

2018-2022- Phase 3 is completed with the addition of new galleries: Nature Exchange, Curious City, and Health Zone are all redone, and the expansion of the Science Garage was completed

2022-2023- Phase 4 Arctic Expedition and front entrance will be finished late 2022

Exhibits Galleries and Science Stage

Arctic Journey 
This gallery opened on September 17, 2022, as the final piece of the Aurora Project.

Copernicus Exhibit: Where Art Meets Science 
Located at the top of the ramp, in coordination with the E.S.A. and the C.S.A., various photos of Europe and Canada are on display taken by the Copernicus Satellite. This collection of 24 images shows the beautiful landscapes across both countries.

Curious City 
Built-in 2019, the Curious City replaces the previous Discoveryland as part of the Aurora Project. An interactive gallery is designed to interest children between the ages of two and eight. It consists of 5 areas: a series of connected "tree-houses" themed as iconic Edmonton landmarks and attractions, crawl spaces to explore sedimentary layers in the River Valley, an airplane traffic control center at the YEG Control Tower, the Muttart Conservatory to explore vegetation, and the High-Level Bridge where you can control lighting displays.

Health Zone
Built in 2021, The Health Gallery opens as part of the Aurora Project. The Health Gallery is divided into five zones: Biology, Choices, Environment, Healthcare, and the L.A.B., where you can try various lab techniques.

Nature Exchange 
Built in 2019, The Nature Exchange opens as a replacement to the previous Environment Gallery as part of the Aurora Project. The Nature Exchange is a gallery where visitors can get points through various means such as analyzing, discussing, interpreting and cataloguing natural items found in nature for points that can be used to buy various items in the shop. The exhibit is also houses animals such as bugs, a snake, and a tarruntula.

In addition to this there are 3 fossils located around the gallery all of which are on loan from the University of Alberta Museums:

 Centrosaurus skull from the Late Cretaceous period (77-76 million years ago)
 Edmontonia sull from the Late Cretaceous (76-71 million years ago). 
 Gorgosaurus skull from the Late Cretaceous period (76-75 million years ago)

S.P.A.C.E Gallery
Built-in 2018, The S.P.A.C.E. Gallery opened as part of the Aurora Project, updating the previously outdated gallery. The S.P.A.C.E (Stars, Planets, Astronauts, Comets, Etc.) Galley consists of a plant wall, various rocket and lunar lander building games, a rocket launcher, a command launch (programming space) and various other activities. Notable objects includes 1980s stamps by Canada Post, the classic lunar lander game from the 1980s Science Centre, and the moon rock (story listed below).

The lunar rock, on long-term loan from NASA, was collected during the Apollo program (more specifically Apollo 15) being a staple of the science center since it opened in 1984. This moon rock, presumed to be basalt, is still sealed in its container making it a priceless artifact to the science center. Though the current weight is unknown the estimated value of the rock is >2 million dollars making it one of the most expensive items in the building.

Science Garage & STEAM Engine 
Built-in late 2019, The Science Garage (and subsequent STEAM Engine expansion) gallery opens as a state-of-the-art makerspace. The Science Garage is an exhibit where visitors can be more hands-on and explore science face-to-face, with activities and learning opportunities such as a vertical climbing wall. There are make-and-take workshops and an array of ever-changing programming offered in this gallery.

This gallery also houses a rolling ball machine (also known as an audio kinetic sculpture) built by George Rhoads in 1986. The former home of this sculpture was outside Fantasyland, West Edmonton Mall, during the reopening on Oct. 1, 1986. After the sculpture was taken down from WEM in the late 1980s, it was moved to the science centre. After being transported in the early 1990s, it was given the name "Electric Ball Circus" and stored outside the front science centre. Due to harsh weather, it faced frequent mechanical issues and was down for a significant time. In 2015 the ball machine was moved inside, which now resides in the Science Garage gallery.

Feature Exhibit Gallery

After opening in 2012 this 1,500-square-metre (16,000 sq ft) gallery has hosted large temporary exhibits that are included with general admission (with some exceptions). Past exhibits had included:

 STAR WARS™ Identities: The Exhibition (2012)
 Body Worlds & The Cycle of Life (2013)
 Harry Potter™: The Exhibition (2013)
 Indiana Jones and the Adventure of Archaeology (2014)
 Dinosaurs Unearthed (2015)
 International Exhibit of Sherlock Holmes (2016)
 Angry Birds Universe (2016)
 New Eyes on the Universe (2017)
 The Science Behind Pixar (2017)
 Popnology (2018)
 Dinosaurs Unearthed: Down to the Bone (2018)
 Body Worlds: Animal Inside Out (2018)
 Mythbusters (2019)
 Marvel: Universe of Super Heroes (2019)
 The Science of Ripley’s Believe It Or Not! (2020)
 EXPEDITION: DINOSAUR (2021)
 James Cameron Challenging The Deep (2021)
 Apollo 11: When we went to the moon (2022)

Science Stage
Built during the 2001 Odyssium expansion, the Syncrude Science Stage features a staff member demonstrating science, typically involving flammable gases, dry ice, or electricity. A child from the audience will often be called upon to assist the demonstrator with an activity. The demonstrations are included with general admission.

Facilities

IMAX Theatre
A 275-seat theatre showing current educational movies, shot in high resolution IMAX film reel. The Telus World of Science features the original IMAX Theatre in Western Canada. Images are enhanced by a custom designed six-channel, multi-speaker sound system are projected onto a 13m x 19m (4 storey x 6 storey) screen.

In early 2016, renovations had been completed in the IMAX theatre, upgrading it to an IMAX Laser 4K Projector system (one of 3 theatres in Canada).

Admission to the IMAX theatre is not included with general admission. Recently, the IMAX Theatre began showing Hollywood blockbusters (such as Batman v Superman or Zootopia) within a few months after screening in cinemas. As with the educational films, these are not included in the admission price and can be more expensive than the educational films. The Hollywood films cannot be used in the Science Centre + IMAX combos.

Margaret Zeidler Star Theatre
The 250-seat large dome theatre that was formerly used for laser shows and star shows. It was the largest such theater in Canada when the center opened in 1984. In 2008, the Margaret Zeidler Star Theatre changed its projection system and educational content to a full dome immersive video experience. The Telus World of Science Edmonton was the first planetarium and science center in Canada to showcase this new technology for domed theatres. Admission to shows in the Star Theatre is included in general admission. The Star Theatre is additionally equipped with high powered lasers for weekly laser shows.

Purple Pear and Gift Shop
The science centre has a café for visitors and for special events such as fundraisers. The café was undergoing renovations as of early 2016 with an estimated completion by the end of August 2016, though it was delayed until November 2016. The café is also responsible for providing the concession, which is currently hosted in the main lobby, next to the box office.

In November 2016, the cafe re-opened, but under a new name, The Purple Pear and a new focus on fresher, and local ingredients. They were also the first location in Western Canada to use tagged Coca-Cola Freestyle machines.

There is also a gift shop in the lobby, featuring a range of educational products, books, gift items, and other knick-knacks.

Coronation Park Facilities

Queen Elizabeth II Planetarium (QEP)- Future 
Built in 1959, the Queen Elizabeth Planetarium was the original home of the science centre. The RASC previously ran the QEP from 1960-1983 until the Edmonton Space Science foundation took over soon afterward. In 2016 the City of Edmonton announced plans to restore the planetarium and grant it full heritage status. As of late 2021 the QEP's construction was finished and waits for reopening in the coming months.

Observatory
Built the same time as the original Edmonton Science Centre, the Observatory opened its doors in 1984. This outdoor structure is located in Coronation Park and It is free of charge, but it opens only when the weather permits, and it closes if the temperature is below . It is equipped with seven telescopes, including a Meade 16" LX200, a  Starfire refractor, and three solar telescopes all provided by the Royal Astronomical Society of Canada (Edmonton Centre).

See also
 Telus World of Science (disambiguation)
 TELUS Spark Science Centre, Calgary
 List of astronomical observatories in Canada

References

External links

 Official web site of the Telus World of Science, Edmonton

IMAX venues
Museums in Edmonton
Science museums in Canada
Space-related tourist attractions
Douglas Cardinal buildings
Astronomical observatories in Canada
1984 establishments in Alberta